Advocate Faith Dikeledi Pansy Tlakula popularly known as Pansy Tlakula is the Chairperson of the Information Regulator of South Africa. She was born in Mafikeng and got married at Waterval township, Elim in Limpopo. Her husband's family, the Tlakulas, are a powerful ruling class at Elim. They own Elim Mall and the surrounding lands at Elim CBD. Hakamela Tlakula, the grandfather of Advocate Tlakula's husband, is the brain behind the establishment of Elim Hospital and was a leading figure of the Swiss Mission Church at Elim.

Life
Tlakula was born on 18 December 1957. She studied law at the University of the Witwatersrand before completing her master's degree at Harvard. She has a master in law and has headed different influential positions.

African Commission on Human and Peoples’ Rights
Tlakula was appointed in 2005 as member of the African Commission on Human and Peoples’ Rights (ACmHPR). She served the ACmHPR for 12 years, until November 2017. She held the mandates of Special Rapporteur on Freedom of Expression and Access to Information, Chairperson of the Working Group no Specific Issues related to the work of the African Commission, and, between 2015 and 2017, she served as Chairperson of the ACmHPR.

Controversy
Tlakula handed her resignation as Independent Electoral Commission chairperson to President Jacob Zuma after mounting pressure to clear her name over a leasing deal corruption scandal where a contract to move the offices of IEC to its new location was awarded to someone whom it was believed had a relationship with her.

References

Living people
South African women in politics
1957 births
Harvard University alumni
University of Limpopo alumni